A penumbral lunar eclipse will take place on Monday, April 3, 2034.

Related lunar eclipses

Lunar year series

See also 
List of lunar eclipses and List of 21st-century lunar eclipses

Notes

External links 
 

2034-04
2034-04
2034 in science